Thurston Joseph Moore (born July 25, 1958) is an American guitarist, singer and songwriter best known as a member of the rock band Sonic Youth. He has also participated in many solo and group collaborations outside Sonic Youth, as well as running the Ecstatic Peace! record label. Moore was ranked 34th in Rolling Stones 2004 edition of the "100 Greatest Guitarists of All Time".

In 2012, Moore started a new band Chelsea Light Moving. Chelsea Light Moving eponymous debut was released on March 5, 2013. Since 2015, Chelsea Light Moving has been disbanded after one studio album release. Moore and the other members of the band continue to make music under his solo project and other bands.

Early years
Moore was born July 25, 1958, at Doctors Hospital in Coral Gables, Florida, to George E. Moore, a professor of music, and Eleanor Nann Moore. In 1967, he and his family (including brother Frederick Eugene Moore, born 1953, and sister Susan Dorothy Moore, born 1956) moved to Bethel, Connecticut. Raised Catholic, he attended St. Joseph's School in Danbury, followed by St. Mary's School in Bethel and attended Bethel High School from 1973 to 1976. He enrolled at Western Connecticut State University in fall 1976, but left after one quarter and moved to East 13th Street between Aves A and B in New York City to join the burgeoning post-punk and no wave music scenes. It was there that he was able to watch shows by the likes of Patti Smith and spoken-word performances by William S. Burroughs. At that time, the arrival of new groups changed his view on music and all of his records "got kind of put into the basement. And they were supplanted by [...] the Sex Pistols and Blondie and Talking Heads and Siouxsie and the Banshees. It was a completely new world, a new identity of music that was an option for youth culture." In 1980 he moved in with Kim Gordon to an apartment at 84 Eldridge St. below artist Dan Graham, eventually befriending him, sometimes using records from Graham's collection for mix tapes.

Once in the city, Moore was briefly a member of the hardcore punk band Even Worse, featuring future The Big Takeover editor (and future Springhouse drummer) Jack Rabid. After exiting the band, Moore and Lee Ranaldo learned experimental guitar techniques in Glenn Branca's "guitar orchestras". Moore has spoken about influences on his music tastes at this time, including British bands Wire, the Pop Group, the Raincoats, the Slits, and Public Image Ltd ("I used to have these fantasies in the 70s about leaving New York and coming to London to hang out with Public Image").

Sonic Youth

Moore met Kim Gordon in 1980 at the final gig of The Coachmen, the band he was in with J.D. King, Daniel Walworth (replaced by Dave Keay), and Bob Pullin. Moore, with Gordon, Anne Demarinis and Dave Keay formed a band, appearing under names like Male Bonding, Red Milk, and the Arcadians, before settling on Moore's choice of Sonic Youth just before June 1981. The band played Noise Fest in June 1981 at New York's White Columns gallery, where Lee Ranaldo was playing as a member of Glenn Branca's electric guitar ensemble as well as in duo with David Linton as Avoidance Behavior. Moore invited Ranaldo, who he had known when The Coachmen shared a CBGB stage with Ranaldo's 1970s band The Flux, to join the band. The new trio played three songs at the festival later in the week without a drummer. Each band member took turns playing the drums, until they met drummer Richard Edson. The band signed to Neutral Records, then to Homestead Records, and then to SST Records.

Moore and Ranaldo make extensive use of unusual guitar tunings, often heavily modifying their instruments to provide unusual timbres and drones. They are known for bringing upwards of fifty guitars to every gig, using some guitars for one song only. In 2004, Rolling Stone ranked Moore and Ranaldo the 33rd and 34th Greatest Guitarists of All Time.

Thurston Moore has explained the band's decision to sign with DGC Records at a time when many were fiercely dedicated to independent record labels like SST, Dischord and Sub Pop:
"We noticed Hüsker Dü's music hadn't changed when they signed to Warner. On the independent labels we dealt with, SST Records, Blast First Records and Neutral Records, if there was accounting, it was always somewhat suspect. With Geffen, we would get an advance that would allow us to be able to pay our rents, get health insurance, have a slightly better lifestyle, and maybe, just maybe, not have to work day jobs. We felt like we could negotiate a contract that would make sense."

When Steve Albini accused corporate labels of ripping off artists Moore wrote in response that a band "getting butt fucked by corporate labels [must] be really stupid". He defended the band's decision to sign with DGC Records explaining that they knew what they were getting into and viewed it more as "buying in" than "selling out".

While recording Goo, Moore played the Nirvana album Bleach for Masterdisk audio engineer Howie Weinberg saying that he would be very happy if the record sounded like Bleach. Weinberg was surprised by the request to emulate a recording as primitive as Bleach (which was recorded on a $600 budget). Moore has said that he "really love[s] that record", describing it as "primal" and the songwriting as "completely melodious" but also "punk".

In 2011, Moore and his wife, Sonic Youth bassist Kim Gordon, separated; shortly afterward, Sonic Youth went on indefinite hiatus. Though his marriage was ending Moore never claimed that Sonic Youth was finished.

Work outside Sonic Youth
In addition to his work with Sonic Youth, Moore has also released albums as a solo artist. He and Gordon released a few songs as Mirror/Dash. Moore established Protest Records as an online gesture of activism but the project has since lapsed. Moore has collaborated with scores of musicians, including Maryanne Amacher, Lydia Lunch, Don Dietrich and Jim Sauter of Borbetomagus, DJ Spooky, William Hooker, Daniel Carter, Christian Marclay, Mike Watt, Loren Mazzacane Connors, Dredd Foole, William Winant, The Thing, Nels Cline, Cock E.S.P., John Moloney, Glenn Branca, Yamantaka Eye, Beck, My Cat is an Alien, John Russell, Steve Noble, John Edwards, Haino Keiji, John Zorn, Yoko Ono, Takehisa Kosugi, and others.

In the early 1990s, Moore formed the side band Dim Stars, with Richard Hell, Don Fleming, Steve Shelley with a guest appearance by Robert Quine. Moore performed solo on the side stage of the 1993 Lollapalooza tour. Additionally, Moore also contributed guitar work and backing vocals on "Crush with Eyeliner", which appeared on R.E.M.'s Monster. He played Fred Cracklin in the Space Ghost Coast to Coast episode dedicated to Sonny Sharrock. In 2000 he contributed improvised guitar pieces for a collaborative project with conceptual artist/guitarist Marco Fusinato. Since 2004, he has recorded and performed with the noise collective To Live and Shave in L.A., the lineup of which also features Andrew W.K. He recorded with the band at Sonic Youth's former studio in Manhattan, and later performed with them at the George W. Bush "anti-inaugural" Noise Against Fascism concert in Washington, D.C., which Moore curated, named in reference to Sonic Youth's 1992 song "Youth Against Fascism". Moore curated the "Nightmare Before Christmas" weekend of the All Tomorrow's Parties music festival in December 2006.

On September 18, 2007, Moore's label Ecstatic Peace released a solo album titled Trees Outside The Academy. The album was recorded at J Mascis' studio in Amherst, Massachusetts. The album features Sonic Youth drummer Steve Shelley and violinist Samara Lubelski. The album also features collaborations between Mascis and Charalambides' Christina Carter, who performs a duet with Moore on the track, "Honest James".

On September 24, 2008, Moore was working on a song with former Be Your Own Pet vocalist Jemina Pearl, a cover of the Ramones song "Sheena Is a Punk Rocker". The song was recorded for the teenage drama Gossip Girl and was featured in the episode "There Might Be Blood".

Since 2008, Moore has provided narration for a variety of documentaries on the National Geographic Channel. His work includes Inside: Straight Edge and the Hard Time series about life in prison.

On September 25, 2012, Moore and Kim Gordon released a collaborative album with Yoko Ono titled Yokokimthurston.

In 2012 Moore started a new band called Chelsea Light Moving. Their first track, "Burroughs", was released as a free download. Their eponymous debut album was released on March 5, 2013. The release coincided with the 2013 SXSW Festival where they made numerous appearances including a free show at Mellow Johnny's bike shop.

In July 2012 Moore had joined the black metal super group Twilight.

On November 24, 2013, he played guitar on "This Town Ain't Big Enough for Both of Us" alongside Ron and Russell Mael in a Sparks concert at the Union Chapel, Islington, London.

In September 2014, Moore released The Best Day, a solo album featuring Steve Shelley and My Bloody Valentine's Debbie Googe as rhythm section, and James Sedwards on guitar.

In April 2018, Moore presented at London's Barbican Centre his work 'Galaxies', an experimental 12-string guitar ensemble. Among the twelve person orchestra were Deb Googe, Jonah Falco, Rachel Aggs, Joseph Coward and others.

In 2019, Moore released Spirit Counsel, an avant-garde rock three-disc box set. The first track, "Alice Moki Jayne", is a 63-minute long song named for the spouses of John Coltrane, Don Cherry, and Ornette Coleman. The 28 minute "8 Spring Street" is named for the former address of Glenn Branca. The 55-minute final track, "Galaxies (Sky)", was inspired by a poem by Sun Ra.

In late 2020, Moore released a solo album entitled By the Fire which featured guitarist James Sedwards and bassist Debbie Googe as on the earlier The Best Days album.

In February 2021, Moore surprise-released an instrumental album entitled Screen Time.

Work on soundtracks

In 1994, Moore teamed up with Greg Dulli of The Afghan Whigs, Don Fleming of Gumball, Mike Mills of R.E.M., and Dave Grohl of Nirvana/Foo Fighters, to form the Backbeat Band, which recorded the soundtrack album to the movie Backbeat. In 1998 Moore played on the soundtrack of the film Velvet Goldmine as a member of Wylde Ratttz. Moore composed original music for such films as Heavy (1995), Bully (2001), and Manic (2001). In 2007, Moore also appeared with noise/improv group Original Silence, featuring Norwegian drummer Paal Nilssen-Love, guitarist Terrie Ex, Jim O'Rourke, saxophonist Mats Gustafsson and bassist Massimo Pupillo. The group released the live album The First Original Silence in 2007, on Oslo (Norway) label SmallTown Superjazz, and a second album The Second Original Silence in 2008.

Moore scored the 2022 HBO miniseries Irma Vep.

Record label and writings
Moore and other Sonic Youth members published the irreverent music zine Sonic Death. Moore runs the record label Ecstatic Peace! Beginning in 1993, this label jointly released records with rock critic Byron Coley's label, Father Yod, as Ecstatic Yod Records.

Moore reviewed new music in Arthur in a column entitled "Bull Tongue" written jointly with Byron Coley. Since the demise of Arthur, Bull Tongue exists as a fanzine edited by Coley and features underground music writing. Moore created, with Chris Habib, the website Protest Records, named for its protest against United States' invasions in the Middle East. Moore was the editor/overseer of the 2005 book Mix Tape: The Art of Cassette Culture. He published a highly influential list of collectible free jazz records in Grand Royal magazine.

Ecstatic Peace Library is the book publishing company founded by Thurston Moore and visual book editor Eva Prinz in 2010. The company publishes mainly poetry, but also a collection of books about the early Norwegian black metal scene, experimental jazz from the 70s and other niche subjects.

Teaching
In 2015 Moore was appointed honorary professor at the Rhythmic Music Conservatory (RMC) in Copenhagen, Denmark, where he periodically conducts workshops and master classes.

Politics and activism

Moore is anti-capitalist, and since the 1980s, Moore and his bandmates have been described as anarchists, a label Moore has denied. However, in 2013, he would commend the Occupy Wall Street protests by announcing his support for its anarcho-communist elements.

Since the founding of Sonic Youth, Moore and members of the band have been famously critical of the music industry and the supposed monopolization of youth culture, with Moore stating in 1991 during filming of The Year Punk Broke, 
"People see rock and roll as youth culture, and when youth culture becomes monopolized by big business, what are the youth to do? I think we should destroy the bogus capitalist process that is destroying youth culture".

Since 2004, Moore has participated in a cultural boycott of Israel, likening the country to an apartheid state and criticizing bands like Dinosaur Jr. and Radiohead for performing in the country.

In June 2016, Moore endorsed the candidacy of Bernie Sanders, releasing a track featuring excerpts from Sanders' speeches to coincide along his endorsement.

In November 2019, along with other public figures, Moore signed a letter supporting Labour Party leader Jeremy Corbyn describing him as "a beacon of hope in the struggle against emergent far-right nationalism, xenophobia and racism in much of the democratic world" and endorsed him in the 2019 UK general election.

In October 2022, Moore expressed support for former president Lula in the 2022 Brazilian general election.

Personal life

On June 9, 1984, Moore married Sonic Youth bassist/vocalist Kim Gordon. They have a daughter: Coco Hayley Gordon Moore (born July 1, 1994). On October 14, 2011, the couple announced that they were separating due to an extramarital affair Moore engaged in with art book editor Eva Prinz, who was also married at the time. Moore and Gordon divorced in 2013.  Moore was residing in Stoke Newington, London, with Prinz.

Equipment
Moore uses a large selection of Fender guitars during Sonic Youth gigs, most frequently a Jazzmaster.  His primary stage amp has been the Peavey Roadmaster paired with a Marshall cabinet.  He has used the ProCo Rat, Big Muff, and MXR Blue Box pedals in various combinations to achieve his unique distorted and feedback-laden guitar sound.

Moore is a key figure in the popularization and resurrection of the Fender Jazzmaster. In 2009, Fender introduced a Lee Ranaldo signature edition of a Sapphire Blue Transparent version featuring two Fender Wide Range humbucking pickups and a Forest Green transparent finish for Moore, equipped with a pair of Seymour Duncan Antiquity II Jazzmaster single-coil pickups.

In 2016 Yuri Landman made a special 10-string drone guitar for Moore at the request of Premier Guitar.

Discography

Solo
 Psychic Hearts (Geffen, 1995)
 Trees Outside the Academy (Ecstatic Peace!, 2007)
 Demolished Thoughts (Matador, 2011) (UK chart peak: No. 119)
 The Best Day (Matador, 2014) (UK chart peak: No. 78)
 Rock n Roll Consciousness (Caroline, 2017) (UK chart peak: No. 65)
 Spirit Counsel (2019)
 By the Fire (2020)
 Screen Time (2021)

As member
With Sonic Youth

With Chelsea Light Moving
 2013 Chelsea Light Moving

With Pvre Matrix
 2015 Burning Sulfur

With Twilight
 2014 III: Beneath Trident's Tomb
 2018 Trident Death Rattle

Collaborations
 1990 – Barefoot in the Head – with Jim Sauter & Don Dietrich, liner notes by Thomas Pynchon
 1993 – Shamballa – with William Hooker & Elliott Sharp
 1995 – Klangfarbenmelodie & the Colorist Strikes Primitive – with Tom Surgal
 1996 – Pillow Wand – with Nels Cline
 1996 – Piece for Yvonne Rainer – with Yoshimi & Mark Ibold
 1997 – MMMR – with Loren Mazzacane Connors, Jean-Marc Montera & Lee Ranaldo (Numero Zero Audio)
 1998 – Foot – with Don Fleming & Jim Dunbar
 1998 – Root – Remix Project
 1999 – The Promise – with Evan Parker & Walter Prati
 2000 – New York – Ystad – Thurston Moore, Lee Ranaldo, Steve Shelley, Mats Gustafsson
 2000 – TM/MF – Thurston Moore, Marco Fusinato
 2001 – Three Incredible Ideas – Thurston Moore/Walter Prati/Giancarlo Schiaffini
 2012 – Yokokimthurston – Yoko Ono,/Thurston Moore/Kim Gordon
 2013 – "@" – John Zorn/Thurston Moore
 2014 – Cuts of Guilt, Cuts Deeper – Merzbow/Balázs Pándi/Mats Gustafsson/Thurston Moore
 2014 – Live – The Thing & Thurston Moore
 2018 – Cuts Up Cuts Out - Merzbow/Balázs Pándi/Mats Gustafsson/Thurston Moore

Limited edition noise, experimental, drone
 2006 – Flipped Out Bride 12 (Blossoming Noise, 2006), limited edition of 500 blue marbled vinyl
 2006 – Free/Love (Blossoming Noise, 2006), limited edition of 90 cassettes
 2007 – Black Weeds-White Death (Meudiademorte, 2007), limited edition of 200 cassettes
 2008 – Sensitive/Lethal
 2008 – Blindfold (Destructive Industries), limited edition of 200 cassettes
 2008 – Built for Lovin (Lost Treasures of the Underworld), limited edition of 500 vinyl
 2010 – Suicide Notes for Acoustic Guitar EP
 2010 – Schwarze Polizei with Kommissar Hjuler, Goaty Tapes, limited edition of 50 cassettes
 2021 - Screen Time

Free improvisation
 2004 – Thurston Moore - Kapotte Muziek by Thurston Moore Korm Plastics, Kapotte Muziek)
 2007 – The Roadhouse Session Vol. 1 with Chris Corsano/Paul Flaherty/Wally Shoup
 2008 – Untitled with Paul Flaherty, Bill Nace
 2011 – Les Anges Du Péché with Jean-Marc Montera, Lee Ranaldo
 2011 – Solo Acoustic Volume Five – Part of the VDSQ (Vin Du Select Qualitite) acoustic guitar series
 2013 – @ with John Zorn

Live
 1996 – Piece for Jetsun Dolma with Tom Surgal and William Winant at Festival International de Musique Actuelle de Victoriaville, released by Les Disques VICTO
 2012 – Play Some Fucking Stooges with Mats Gustafsson on tour in 2009. Limited edition of 450 copies.
 2013 – Vi Är Alla Guds Slavar with Mats Gustafsson, Cafe OTO, September 22 & 23, 2012. Limited edition of 1000 copies.
 2013 – The Only Way to Go is Straight Through with Loren Connors, NYC 2012. Limited edition of 3,000 copies.
 2013 – Comes Through in the Call Hold with Clark Coolidge, Anne Waldman], Harry Smith cottage at Naropa, June 30, 2012, released by Fast Speaking Music.
 2013 – Last Notes with Joe McPhee, Bill Nace, Roulette NYC, May 31, 2012. Limited vinyl edition of 250 copies.

Caught on Tape series
 2012 – Fundamental Sunshine (Antwerp-Paris-Rotterdam-Amsterdam March 20–23, 2012. Cassette)
 2012 – Caught on Tape (Recorded live to cassette in Europe – March 2012. Limited edition of 133 hand numbered copies)
 2013 – Acting the Maggot (recorded at the Beachland Ballroom 2012. Limited edition of 120 lps)
 2013 – Fundamental Sunshine (Cassette)
 2013 – Banjaxed Blues (Recorded in Baltimore, MD in December 2012 and Belfast, Northern Ireland in January 2013. Edition of 45 copies)
 2013 – Irish-American Prayer (Live in Brooklyn December 2012. Limited CDr)

With Diskaholics Anonymous Trio
 2001 – Diskaholics Anonymous Trio (Recorded at Kulturbro Ystad-Österlen, Sweden, 2000)
 2006 – Weapons of Ass Destruction (Recorded live, Ystads Teater, Sweden, October 6, 2002)
 2006 – Live in Japan Vol. 1 (Recorded live, Tokyo, Japan, 2002)

With Original Silence
 2007 – The First Original Silence (Recorded live, Teatro Ariosto, Reggio Emilia, Italy, September 30, 2005 )
 2008 – The Second Original Silence (Recorded live, Brancaleone, Rome, September 28, 2005 )

With Glenn Branca
 1981 – Symphony No. 1 "Tonal Plexus" with Glenn Branca, Lee Ranaldo, Anne DeMarinis
 1982 – Symphony No. 2 "The Peak of the Sacred"
 1983 – Symphony No. 3 "Gloria" – Music for the first 127 intervals of the harmonic series

With the Coachmen
 1979 – Failure to Thrive

Singles
 "The Church Should Be for the Outcasts, Not a Church That Casts People Out" (7") [as Male Slut] (1995)
 "Sputnik", with Don Fleming on one side, Pete Kember aka Sonic Boom on the other. Gilltery vinyl (1997)
 "Wonderful Witches" (2007)

Split LPs
 From the Earth to the Spheres (split with My Cat Is An Alien, 2004)
 Thrash Sabbatical (Deathbomb Arc, 2008 four-way split 12" + 2x7" w/Men Who Can't Love, Barrabarracuda, Kevin Shields)
 Mature, Lonely + Out of Control/Alternative Hair Styles (Nihilist, 2008 split LP with Graham Moore)

Remixes
 Rising Mixes by Yoko Ono (1996)
 Sacrilege: The Remixes by Can (1996)
 Bustin'and Dronin by Blur (1998)
 7/11 by Un Drame Musical Instantané (1999)

Guest appearances
 1992 – Do You Wanna Dance, Dim Stars
 1994 – Monster, R.E.M.
 1997 – Legend of the Blood Yeti, XIII Ghosts & Derek Bailey
 1998 – Velvet Goldmine – Music from the Original Motion Picture, "T.V. Eye" with the Wylde Ratttz
 2007 – Touch the Iceberg, Owl Xounds Exploding Galaxy)
 2017 — 7/11, Moore's remix of L'homme à la caméra by Un Drame Musical Instantané (transparent vinyl)

Music videos 
 "Ono Soul" (1995)
 "Circulation" (2011)
 "Speak To The Wild" (2014)
 "Smoke Of Dreams" (2017)
 "Aphrodite" (2017)
 "Cantaloupe" (2020)

Books
 Alabama Wildman (2000)
 Mix Tape: The Art of Cassette Culture (2005)
 Grunge (with Michael Lavine, 2009)
 Punk House: Interiors in Anarchy (with Abby Banks, Timothy Findlen, 2007)
 No Wave: Post-Punk. Underground. New York. 1976–1980. (with Byron Coley, 2008)
 James Hamilton: You Should Have Heard Just What I Seen (with James Hamilton, 2010)
 Lion: Only Noise (And Poems) (2011)

References

External links

Official Myspace page for "Kill Your Idols", a documentary about the Cinema of Transgression featuring Thurston Moore
Sonic Youth.com – Official Sonic Youth website

Ecstatic Peace! Records.
Spike magazine interview.
Writings by Thurston on 2003 NYC power blackout.
Thurston Moore's "Skrewer Boy" published on the Tellus Audio Cassette Magazine @ Ubuweb
Pichfork article Working with Jemina

1958 births
Living people
Sonic Youth members
American rock guitarists
American male guitarists
Alternative rock guitarists
American male singers
American rock singers
Songwriters from Florida
American alternative rock musicians
American experimental musicians
Noise rock musicians
Musicians from Miami
American noise musicians
Ecstatic Peace! artists
Northern Spy Records artists
People from Coral Gables, Florida
Swans (band) members
No wave musicians
Record collectors
American expatriates in the United Kingdom
Guitarists from Florida
20th-century American guitarists
Rodney & the Tube Tops members
Matador Records artists
Geffen Records artists
American post-punk musicians
Bethel High School (Connecticut) alumni
Dim Stars members
Twilight (band) members
RareNoiseRecords artists
Chelsea Light Moving members